Communicating Doors is a play written in 1994 by Alan Ayckbourn. The setting is a hotel suite that moves through time from 1974 to 2014. The central character, Poopay, must save herself from the murderous Julian by preventing the murders of Reece's two wives.

Julia McKenzie took the role of Ruella for the UK tour and run at The Gielgud Theatre, which Angela Thorne subsequently took on when the show transferred to The Savoy Theatre.

References

External links
 Communicating Doors on official Ayckbourn site

Plays by Alan Ayckbourn
1994 plays
Science fiction theatre